Kavi Narmad Central Library is a public library in Surat built by the Surat Municipal Corporation in 1991 at Ghod Dod Road.  The library is the largest in the city with 2,26,391 books and a membership of 46,855. The library premises have a total area of 6158 sq. m. and was built at the cost of  4.03 crore. The library also houses a reading room and a newspaper section open to public. It is named after Veer Narmad the famous Gujarati poet from Surat and was opened to public on his 158th birth anniversary.

On 18 January 2011 Information Centre, separate sections for senior citizen and rare book collection, conference hall and audio visual room were added.
More recently, the revitalization of the library was completed.

See also
List of tourist attractions in Surat
Science Centre, Surat

References

Libraries in Surat
Tourist attractions in Surat
Library buildings completed in 1991
1991 establishments in Gujarat
Libraries established in 1991
20th-century architecture in India